Brayton is a locality in the Southern Tablelands of New South Wales, Australia, in the Upper Lachlan Shire.

It was formerly known as Longreach, the name of a property granted to Peter Stuckey in the mid-1820s. The house he built with convict labour is made of sandstone from the area. Further information is in Early Colonial Houses of New South Wales by Rachel Roxburgh. Its name was changed to avoid confusion with the Queensland town of Longreach and apparently named after Lily Brayton, an English actress and singer. It had a public school from 1859 to 1953. This includes periods when it was closed or operated as a "half-time" school.

References

Upper Lachlan Shire
Localities in New South Wales